The 2004 Canadian Professional Soccer League season was the seventh season for the Canadian Professional Soccer League. The season began on May 24, 2004 and concluded on October 11, 2004 with Toronto Croatia defeating Vaughan Shooters 4–0 to capture their second CPSL Championship (known as the Rogers CPSL Cup for sponsorship reasons). The championship was hosted for the first time at Victoria Park Stadium in Brampton, Ontario, which granted the Brampton Hitmen a wildcard berth. In the regular season the Toronto Supra clinched their first Eastern Conference title, while Hamilton Thunder secured their second Western Conference title. Though the league decreased in membership they managed to expand to the Windsor - Detroit territory with the addition of the Windsor Border Stars.

Changes from 2003 season 
The 2004 season saw the league decrease from 13 to 11 teams. The Ottawa Wizards, and the Durham Flames had their franchises revoked. The Laval Dynamites went on hiatus as they awaited the completion of their home venue the Centre Sportif Bois-de-Boulogne. Though the CPSL lost 3 franchises they managed to expand to the Essex County with the addition of the Windsor Border Stars. Founding member the Mississauga Olympians were sold to John O'Neill and replaced the Durham Flames under the name Durham Storm. Vaughan Sun Devils changed their name to the Vaughan Shooters, while the North York Astros joined them in their move to the Ontario Soccer Centre. Director of Officials Tony Camacho resigned and was replaced by former Director at Large Walter Kirchner.

Teams

Final standings

Eastern Conference

Western Conference

Rogers CPSL Championship playoffs

Quarterfinals

Wildcard

Semifinals

Rogers CPSL Championship

All-Star game  
In the 2004 All-Star game Boavista F.C. of the Primeira Liga conducted a North American tour where one of their opponents were a CPSL Select team assembled by Harry Gauss, and Steve Nijjar. The match was played at Cove Road Stadium in London, Ontario.

Top goal scorers

Updated: September 11, 2017 
Source: http://www.rocketrobinsoccerintoronto.com/reports04/04cpsl2x.htm

CPSL Executive Committee 
A list of the 2004 CPSL Executive Committee.

Individual awards

The annual CPSL awards ceremony was held on October 9, 2004 at the La Contessa Banquet Hall in North York, Toronto. London City and Windsor Border Stars were both tied with the most wins with 2 awards. London City's Paul Munster had a tremendous season where he captured both the Golden Boot and Rookie of the Year, which later spring boarded his career back to Europe to sign with Slavia Prague in the Czech First League. After leading expansion franchise Windsor Border Stars to an Open Canada Cup, former English football player Pat Hilton was given the Coach of the Year. While Windsor's Justin Marshall was voted the Defender of the Year.

The league chose Danny Amaral as its MVP after making his return to Canadian soccer with Toronto Supra after several seasons in Portugal. George Azcurra of Toronto Croatia won his fourth Goalkeeper of the Year. The Referee of the Year went to Amato De Luca, which marked his second CPSL accolade. The most disciplined team throughout the season were Durham Storm. The league also introduced the President of the Year award in order to recognize the top executive or organizer, and the inaugural recipient was North York Astros Bruno Ierullo.

References

External links
Rocket Robin's Home Page of the 2004 CPSL Season

2004
2004 domestic association football leagues
Canadian Professional Soccer League